The wildlife of Réunion is composed of its flora, fauna and fungi. Being a small island, it only has nine native species of mammals, but ninety-one species of birds.

Fauna

Birds

Mammals 

Mauritian flying fox Pteropus niger VU
Small Mauritian flying fox Pteropus subniger EX
Lesser yellow bat Scotophilus borbonicus CR
Natal free-tailed bat Mormopterus acetabulosus VU
Mauritian tomb bat Taphozous mauritianus LC
Southern right whale Eubalaena australis LC (rarer in today's Réunion)
Humpback whale Megaptera novaeangliae LC
Sei whale Balaenoptera borealis EN
Southern fin whale Balaenoptera physalus quoyi EN
Sperm whale Physeter macrocephalus VU
Dwarf sperm whale Kogia sima LR/lc
Blainville's beaked whale Mesoplodon densirostris DD
Gray's beaked whale Mesoplodon grayi DD
Short-finned pilot whale Globicephala macrorhynchus DD
Those mammals not native to Réunion include the tailless tenrec, dog, cat, pig, goat, sheep, rat and cattle.

Reptiles

Geckos 
Seven species of day geckos and four species of night geckos:
 Réunion Island day gecko, (Phelsuma borbonica borbonica), endemic
 Réunion Island ornate day gecko, (Phelsuma inexpectata), endemic
 Gold dust day gecko, (Phelsuma laticauda), introduced from Madagascar
 Lined day gecko (Phelsuma lineata), introduced from Madagascar
 Blue-tailed day gecko (Phelsuma cepediana), introduced from Mauritius around 1960
 Indopacific tree gecko, (Hemiphyllodactylus typus), introduced
 Tropical house gecko, (Hemidactylus mabouia), introduced
 Common house gecko, (Hemidactylus frenatus), introduced
 Phelsuma madagascariensis, introduced from Madagascar in 1970 by a veterinarian
 Pacific gecko, (Gehyra mutilata), introduced

Agamid lizards 
 Oriental garden lizard, (Calotes versicolor), introduced
 Rainbow agama, (Agama agama), introduced around 1999/2000

Scincidae 
 Bojer's skink, (Gongylomorphus bojerii), endemic to Mauritius (introduced)
 Mauritius skink, (Leiolopisma mauritiana) (extinct around 1600)

Chameleons 
 Panther chameleon, (Furcifer pardalis), introduced from Madagascar

Snakes 
Two introduced species;
 Brahminy blind snake, (Typhlops braminus)
 Indian wolf snake, (Lycodon aulicus), introduced from Mauritius around 1850

Turtles

Marine turtles 
see also:
 Green sea turtle, (Chelonia mydas)
 Hawksbill sea turtle, (Eretmochelys imbricata)
 Loggerhead sea turtle, (Caretta caretta)
 Olive ridley sea turtle, (Lepidochelys olivacea)
 Leatherback sea turtle, (Dermochelys coriacea)

Land turtles 
 Réunion giant tortoise, (Cylindraspis indica) (became extinct 1800)
 Radiated tortoise, (Astrochelys radiata), introduced from Madagascar

Molluscs

Fungi

See also 
 List of birds of Réunion
 List of mammals of Réunion
 List of extinct animals of Réunion

References 

 

Reunion
Biota of Réunion